Contigo Navarra is an electoral alliance for the 2023 regional and local elections in Navarre, Spain, formed by We Can (Podemos), United Left of Navarre (IUN/NEB) and Assembly (Batzarre). In December 2022, Green Alliance (AV) joined the coalition.

Composition

References

Political parties in Navarre
Political parties established in 2022
2022 establishments in Spain
Political party alliances in Spain
Unidas Podemos